The Lutheran Diocese of Warsaw is one of the six dioceses of the Evangelical Church of the Augsburg Confession in Poland (Poland's only Lutheran church), covering most of central and eastern Poland. The Lutheran population in the area in 2016 was 3968, which amounts to about 7% of the total number of adherents of the church in Poland. There were 18 ordained ministers in the diocese in 2016.

Structure 
The Lutheran Diocese of Warsaw has 21 parishes: 6 in Masovian Voivodeship (two parishes in Warsaw, one in Radom, Płock, Żyrardów and Węgrów), 14 in Łódź Voivodeship (in Łódź, Piotrków Trybunalski, Pabianice, Tomaszów Mazowiecki, Zgierz, Kutno, Zduńska Wola, Wieluń, Aleksandrów Łódzki, Ozorków, Łask, Rawa Mazowiecka, Zelów, Poddębice) and 1 in Lublin Voivodeship (in Lublin). The diocese also covers the area of Świętokrzyskie Voivodeship, and although there are no independent parishes in the area, church services are held in the regional capital, Kielce, in a filial church that is administratively part of the parish in Radom.
The seat of the bishop is the Church of St. Peter and St. Paul in Pabianice.

History 
The territorial division of the Diocese of Warsaw as affirmed by the presidential decree of 1936 included 17 parishes, including two in the city of Warsaw itself. In 1939 the Lutheran population of the diocese was 49,405, of which 61.8% were German and 38.2% Polish. Although the total figure was ten times larger than the current numbers, the area of the diocese was significantly smaller than it is nowadays. With separate dioceses in Płock, Lublin, Piotrków and Łódź, the bishop of Warsaw in the Second Polish Republic was responsible for a far smaller area than is currently the case.

The diocese of Warsaw was re-established in the new territorial division of the church following World War II. The dissolution of the diocese of Łódź in 1952 gave it its present shape.

List of Bishops 
Woldemar Gastpary : 1954~1957
Vacant (1957~1966)
Ryszard Trenkler : 1966~1979
Jan Walter : 1979~1995
Mieczysław Cieślar : 1996~2010
Jan Cieślar : 2010~

Churches in the Diocese of Warsaw

Footnotes

References

External links 
Official Website of the Lutheran Diocese of Warsaw (pol.)

Christianity in Warsaw
Evangelical Church of the Augsburg Confession in Poland
Lutheran dioceses in Poland